Kokoro is a town in the Collines Department of Benin. It is in the southeast of the country

Populated places in Benin